The Gehrener Schichten (German for Gehren Formation) is a geologic formation in Germany. The fluvial to lacustrine shales preserve fossils dating back to the Late Carboniferous period (Stephanian C in European stratigraphy or Gzhelian in international stratigraphy).

Fossil content 
The following fossils were reported from the formation:
 Insects
 Protelytroptera
 Blattocoleidae
 Blattocoleus tillyari
 Blattodea
 Mylacridae
 Opsiomylacris (Opsiomylacris) densistriata

See also 
 List of fossiliferous stratigraphic units in Germany

References

Bibliography 
 
 

Geologic formations of Germany
Carboniferous System of Europe
Carboniferous Germany
Gzhelian
Shale formations
Fluvial deposits
Lacustrine deposits
Carboniferous northern paleotropical deposits
Paleontology in Germany